Stenocarsia is a genus of moths of the family Erebidae. The genus was erected by George Hampson in 1926.

Species
Stenocarsia metaplatys Hampson, 1926 New Guinea
Stenocarsia nebulosa (Rothschild, 1915) New Guinea
Stenocarsia solomonis Hampson, 1926 Solomon Islands
Stenocarsia sthenoptera (Swinhoe, 1895) India (Assam)

References

Calpinae
Moth genera